Maratha Mandir is a cinema hall located in Maratha Mandir Marg, Mumbai, India. It opened on 16 October 1958 and has 1000 seats. In the 1960s and 1970s, it was known for its lavish film launches, but the introduction of multiplexes diverted "class" viewers from establishment with the "masses" of the working class patronizing the theatre instead. It is currently known for holding a record after screening the film Dilwale Dulhania Le Jayenge for 1009 weeks since its release in 1995, on 19 February 2015. As of September 2019, the film has been running for a continuous 1230 weeks. This cinema hall is one of the famous landmarks in Mumbai.

See also 
 Yash Raj Films
 Metro Cinema (Kolkata)
 Shah Rukh Khan

References 

Cinemas in Mumbai
Culture of Mumbai